Eric Pappoe Addo (born 12 November 1978) is a Ghanaian former professional footballer who played as a defender. After retiring, Addo worked as a coach at PSV.

Once heralded as a potential African great thanks to his combination of strength, pace and poise early on, Addo, a combative central defender who could also play as a defensive midfielder, had his budding career blighted by knee injuries.

Club career

Club Brugge 
Born in the Ghanaian capital Accra, Addo began his European career brightly at Club Brugge in 1996 and over three seasons at the Jan Breydelstadion made 65 appearances, scoring five goals. At Brugges, he was viewed as a potential superstar on the European stage, after bursting into the first team ranks and helping them to win the Belgian Championship. He was voted the 1997–98 Young Belgian Footballer of the Year by Belgian journalists and Ghana Player of the Year the same season. He also won the Belgian Ebony Shoe award for being the best African player (or player with African roots) in the Belgian league. The jury was composed of the league clubs' coaches, the Belgium national team coach, sports journalists and an honorary jury.

PSV Eindhoven 
Addo joined PSV Eindhoven during summer 1999 on a five-year contract, although he spent most of his first three years injured or as a substitute. 

He played just 24 times during this period, going out on loan at Roda JC for two years – before finally becoming a regular, as PSV retained their Eredivisie title in 2006. "I'm hoping now to show at Roda what I can do," Addo told Dutch magazine Voetbal International. "When I moved to PSV there was a lot of pressure and obviously it got worst when I was injured. They paid a lot of money for me. I still need to show the supporters what I am capable of and the move to Roda is the solution for me."

A 1–0 away loss at Anfield against Liverpool F.C. in the quarterfinal second leg of the 2006–07 UEFA Champions League was his last game for PSV in the competition. PSV lost 4–0 on aggregate to the 2005 UEFA Champions League winners, after losing 3–0 at home.

On 29 April 2007, Addo won his fifth Eredivisie Championship with PSV in 2006–07, with a 5–1 win on the final day home against Vitesse Arnhem. Pre-match, PSV, Ajax and AZ Alkmaar were tied on 72 points. PSV coach Ronald Koeman started Alex and Addo at the heart of defence in the decider.

Contract extension
On 3 April 2007, Addo told BBC Sport that "I will not extend my contract with PSV because things are not improving here for me. The African Cup of Nations is getting close and if I have to stay I should be guaranteed more playing time to be fit for the tournament in Ghana." He added, "The club understands my situation and they have agreed to allow me to leave at the end of the season."

On 22 April 2007, Addo was linked with a move to Galatasaray S.K. in the Dutch media. He was also linked with FC Twente, whose manager Fred Rutten knows Addo from his time at PSV. However, on 22 May 2007, Addo changed his mind and signed a new contract extension with PSV.

On 26 October 2007, Addo was charged with 'committing an act of gross unsporting conduct' and received a four match ban from UEFA for spitting at Fenerbahçe player Semih Şentürk during an ill-tempered Champions League match on 23 October. PSV later claimed that he was provoked by the striker who elbowed him moments before the incident occurred; this explanation was rejected by the association.

International career
Addo was given the chance to represent his adopted country, Belgium, in the 1998 FIFA World Cup, but instead opted to play for his homeland. However, after playing in the 1998 African Cup of Nations, he spent six years in the international wilderness.

He was a member of the Ghanaian squad at the 2006 FIFA World Cup finals, playing in all four of Ghana's games including the exit to Brazil in the second round. His last game for Ghana was against Mexico in an international friendly in London, UK on 26 March 2008.

Coaching career 
After retiring and acquiring his UEFA Coaching license, Addo was appointed by PSV to serve as the assistant coach to their U-21 side.

Personal life
His brother Ransford is also a former professional footballer.

Eric Addo attended St Anthony's Preparatory School at South Odorkor in Ghana; even at this early developmental stage, he showed great ability when playing soccer with his peers and student in grades ahead of him.

Honours

Club
Club Brugge
 Belgian First Division: 1997–98
 Belgian Supercup: 1996, 1998
PSV Eindhoven
 Eredivisie: 1999–2000, 2000–01, 2004–05, 2005–06, 2006–07, 2007–08
 KNVB Cup: 2004–05. Runner-up: 2005–06
 Johan Cruijff Schaal: 2000, 2001, 2008. Runner-up: 2005, 2006

International
Ghana
 Africa Cup of Nations bronze medal: 2008
 Africa Cup of Nations silver medal: 2010

Individual
 Belgian Young Footballer of the Year: 1997–98
 Belgian Ebony Shoe: 1998
 Ghana Footballer of the Year Award: 1998

References

External links

Fifa 2006 World Cup Profile
UEFA Champions League Profile

1978 births
Living people
Ghanaian footballers
Club Brugge KV players
Roda JC Kerkrade players
PSV Eindhoven players
FC Eindhoven players
Belgian Pro League players
Eredivisie players
Eerste Divisie players
Ghana international footballers
2006 FIFA World Cup players
1998 African Cup of Nations players
2008 Africa Cup of Nations players
2010 Africa Cup of Nations players
Ghanaian expatriate footballers
Ghanaian expatriate sportspeople in Belgium
Expatriate footballers in Belgium
Ghanaian expatriate sportspeople in the Netherlands
Expatriate footballers in the Netherlands
Footballers from Accra
Association football defenders